Walter of Bibbesworth (1235–1270) was an English knight and Anglo-Norman poet. Documents confirm that he held land in the parish of Kimpton, Hertfordshire at the farm now called Bibbsworth Hall ("Bibbs Hall" on some maps). About 1250 he served in Gascony under the seneschal Nicholas de Molis in the army of the English king Henry III. In 1270/1271 he is believed to have taken part in the Ninth Crusade on the evidence of a tençon or poetic argument between himself and Henry de Lacy, 3rd Earl of Lincoln. In the poem Walter, about to depart for Palestine, teases Henry for staying at home for the love of a certain woman. In fact the young Henry de Lacy, "recently married and with heavy responsibilities at home", did not take part in the Ninth Crusade. Walter went and returned. He was buried early in Edward I's reign at Little Dunmow in Essex.

Apart from the tençon Walter is best known for a longer poem which in early manuscripts is called Le Tretiz ("The Treatise"), written in medieval French verse and supplied with Middle English glosses between the lines. It is known in two early recensions, one of which has a preface stating that the Treatise was written for madame Dyonise de Mountechensi (Denise or Dionisie de Munchensi) to help her teach her children French. The Treatise gained popularity and was afterwards incorporated in a late medieval textbook of French, Femina Nova. Bibbesworth has also been credited with two other short poems in medieval French, one in praise of beauty, a second on the Virgin Mary, though the first of these is more likely to be the work of Nicole Bozon.

Works 
 Le Tretiz ("The Treatise")
 "De bone femme la bounté" (attribution doubtful)
 "Amours m'ount si enchaunté"
 "La Pleinte"

References 

 "Parishes: Kimpton" in A History of the County of Hertfordshire, Victoria County History, pp. 29–33
 Andrew Dalby, transl., The Treatise of Walter of Bibbesworth. Totnes: Prospect Books, 2012.  Preview
 Thomas Hinton, "Anglo-French in the Thirteenth Century: A Re-Appraisal of Walter de Bibbesworth's Tretiz" in Modern Language Review vol. 112 (2017), pp. 848-874
Thomas Hinton, "Language, Morality and Wordplay in Anglo-French: The Poetry of Walter de Bibbesworth" in New Medieval Literatures 19 (2019), pp. 89-120
Tony Hunt, "Bibbesworth, Walter of" (2004) on the website of the Oxford Dictionary of National Biography (subscription or UK public library membership required)
 Karen K. Jambeck, "The "Tretiz" of Walter of Bibbesworth: cultivating the vernacular" in Albrecht Classen, ed., Childhood in the Middle Ages and the Renaissance (Berolini: Walter De Gruyter, 2005) pp. 159–184  
 Annie Owen, ed., Le Traité de Walter de Bibbesworth sur la langue française. Paris: PUF, 1929. 
 William Rothwell, "A Mis-Judged Author and a Mis-Used Text: Walter de Bibbesworth and His "Tretiz"" in Modern Language Review vol. 77 (1982) pp. 282-293
 William Rothwell, "Anglo-French in Rural England in the Later Thirteenth Century: Walter of Bibbesworth's Tretiz and the Agricultural Treatises" in Vox Romanica vol. 67 (2008) pp. 100–132
 William Rothwell, editor, "Walter de Bibbesworth: Le Tretiz together with two Anglo-French poems in praise of women" (2009)
 Josiah C. Russell, "Some Thirteenth-Century Anglo-Norman Writers" in Modern Philology vol. 28 (1931) pp. 257–269
 W. Aldis Wright, "Walter de Biblesworth" in Notes and Queries 4th ser. vol. 8 (1871) p. 64 Text at archive.org

External links 
 Walter de Bibbesworth at ARLIMA

13th-century French poets
Anglo-Norman literature
British writers in French
Christians of Lord Edward's crusade
People from North Hertfordshire District
Trouvères
English children's writers
English knights
1235 births
1270 deaths
French male poets